Mueang Sukhothai is the capital district (amphoe mueang) of Sukhothai province, northern Thailand.

Geography
Neighboring districts are (from the southeast clockwise) Kong Krailat, Khiri Mat, Ban Dan Lan Hoi and Si Samrong of Sukhothai Province and Phrom Phiram of Phitsanulok province.

The important water resource is the Yom River.

History
Originally named Mueang as the capital district of Sukhothai Province, in 1917 the district was renamed Thani. In 1932, the province Sukhothai was abolished and merged into Sawankhalok Province. In 1939 the province was renamed Sukhothai, and the district, by then named Sukhothai Thani was renamed Mueang Sukhothai.

Administration
The district is divided into 10 sub-districts (tambons), which are further subdivided into 98 villages (mubans). The town (thesaban mueang) Sukhothai Thani covers tambon Thani. There are a further two sub-district municipalities (thesaban tambon): Ban Suan and Mueang Kao, each covering parts of the same-named tambons. There are a further nine tambon administrative organizations (TAO).

References

External links
amphoe.com (Thai)

Mueang Sukhothai